Fernando Garfella Palmer (9 August 1989 – 9 August 2020) was a Spanish documentary filmmaker, known for his documentaries about the marine life of the Balearic Islands and for his collaboration with the NGO Proactiva Open Arms.

Biography 
Garfella was born in Mallorca, Spain. He was the grandson of the painter Fernando Garfella and elder brother of the journalist Carlos Garfella. Growing up surrounded by the sea, he began diving in his childhood and turned it into his career over time, founding the documentary production company Bogar Films, for which he made approximately 900 dives in the Balearic Islands and their surroundings. In his documentaries he managed to capture images of endangered species such as the pearly razorfish and the long-snouted seahorse, among others.

As a documentarian and rescue worker, Garfella was associated with the NGO Proactiva Open Arms, constantly participating in the rescues of migrants from North Africa to the Spanish coasts. He was also one of the originators and promoters of the Dragonera marine reserve and frequently collaborated with Mallorca Blue, an online platform dedicated to denouncing attacks on the marine environment in the Balearic Islands.

Disappearance and death 
His girlfriend, seeing that he did not surface, alerted a fellow diver, who tried unsuccessfully to rescue Garfella but suffered decompression sickness and had to be rushed by ambulance to the Juaneda Clinic in Palma de Mallorca. The Underwater Activities Special Group (Grupo Especial de Actividades Subacuáticas) of the Civil Guard initiated an exhaustive search for Garfella's body. The body was transported to the Port of Sóller.

References

External links 
Official page of Proactiva Open Arms

1989 births
2020 deaths
Accidental deaths in Spain
People from Palma de Mallorca
Spanish documentary filmmakers
Underwater diving deaths